Capital of Pakistan can mean any of the following:
 
 Karachi, Karachi Capital Territory (1948-1958)
 Rawalpindi, Temporary capital (1958-1969)
 Islamabad. Islamabad Capital Territory (1969-present)